Berezovka is a rural locality (a settlement) in Pospelikhinsky District, Altai Krai, Russia. The population was 76 in 2014.

Geography 
Berezovka is located 31 km north of Pospelikha (the district's administrative centre) by road. Klepechikha is the nearest rural locality.

Ethnicity 
The settlement is inhabited by Russians.

References 

Rural localities in Pospelikhinsky District